Laura Barbosa de Carvalho  (born 1984) is a Brazilian economist, associate professor at the Faculty of Economics and Administration at the University of São Paulo. Carvalho has a master's degree from the Federal University of Rio de Janeiro and a doctorate from the New School. Her research area is macroeconomics, focusing on economic development and income redistribution.

Her 2018 book Valsa Brasileira: do boom ao caos econômico, which analyzes the growth and subsequent crisis of the Brazilian economy starting in 2014, became one of the country's best-selling books that year. The book became a finalist for the 61st Jabuti Prize in the "Humanities" category, but did not win.

Still in 2018, she participated in the initial formulation of the economic proposals of the pre-candidate Guilherme Boulos, who was running for president for the Socialism and Liberty Party in the 2018 presidential election.

She wrote a column for newspaper Folha de S. Paulo from 2015 to 2019. As of 2020, she is a columnist for the news website Nexo.

References

Academic staff of the University of São Paulo
Brazilian economists
1984 births
Living people